Captain Swift is a 1920 American silent drama film directed by Tom Terriss and Chester Bennett and starring Earle Williams, Florence Dixon and Edward Martindel. It is based on the 1898 play of the same title by C. Haddon Chambers.

Synopsis
A notorious Australian outlaw manages to escape with the law close on his heels and heads to England where he lives under an assumed name, and becomes a fixture in London's high society.

Cast
 Earle Williams as Captain Swift
 Florence Dixon as Stella Darbisher
 Edward Martindel as Gardiner 
 Adelaide Prince as Lady Seabrook
 Downing Clarke as Sir Hugh Seabrook
 Barry Baxter as Harry Seabrook
 Alice Calhoun as Mabel Seabrook
 James O'Neill as Marshall
 H.H. Pattee as Ryan

References

Bibliography
 Goble, Alan. The Complete Index to Literary Sources in Film. Walter de Gruyter, 1999.

External links
 

1920 films
1920 drama films
1920s English-language films
American silent feature films
Silent American drama films
American black-and-white films
Films directed by Chester Bennett
Films directed by Tom Terriss
Vitagraph Studios films
Films set in Australia
Films set in London
1920s American films